William Butterfield (7 September 1814 – 23 February 1900) was a Gothic Revival architect and associated with the Oxford Movement (or Tractarian Movement). He is noted for his use of polychromy.

Biography
William Butterfield was born in London in 1814. His parents were strict non-conformists who ran a chemist's shop in the Strand. He was one of nine children and was educated at a local school. At the age of 16, he was apprenticed to Thomas Arber, a builder in Pimlico, who later became bankrupt. He studied architecture under E. L. Blackburne (1833–1836). From 1838 to 1839, he was an assistant to Harvey Eginton, an architect in Worcester, where he became articled. He established his own architectural practice at Lincoln's Inn Fields in 1840.

From 1842 Butterfield was involved with the Cambridge Camden Society, later The Ecclesiological Society. He contributed designs to the Society's journal, The Ecclesiologist. His involvement influenced his architectural style. He also drew religious inspiration from the Oxford Movement and as such, he was very high church despite his non-conformist upbringing. He was a Gothic revival architect, and as such he reinterpreted the original Gothic style in Victorian terms. Many of his buildings were for religious use, although he also designed for colleges and schools.

Butterfield's church of All Saints, Margaret Street, London, was, in the view of Henry-Russell Hitchcock, the building that initiated the High Victorian Gothic era. It was designed in 1850, completed externally by 1853 and consecrated in 1859. Flanked by a clergy house and school, it was intended as a "model" church by its sponsors, the Ecclesiological Society.  The church was built of red-brick, a material long out of use in London, patterned with bands of black brick, the first use of polychrome brick in the city, with bands of stone on the spire. The interior was even more richly decorated, with marble and tile marquetry.

In 1849, just before Butterfield designed the church, John Ruskin had published his Seven Lamps of Architecture, in which he had urged the study of Italian Gothic and the use of polychromy.  Many contemporaries perceived All Saints' as Italian in character, though in fact it combines fourteenth century English details, with a German-style spire.

Also in 1850 he designed, without polychromy, St Matthias' in Stoke Newington, with a bold gable-roofed tower. At St Bartholomew's, Yealmpton in the same year, Butterfield used a considerable amount of marquetry work for the interior, and built striped piers, using two colours of marble.

At Oxford, Butterfield designed Keble College, in a style radically divergent from the university's existing traditions of Gothic architecture, its walls boldly striped with various colours of brick. Intended for clerical students, it was largely built in 1868–70, on a fairly domestic scale, with a more monumental chapel of 1873–6.  In his buildings of 1868–72 at Rugby School, the polychromy is even more brash.

Butterfield received the RIBA Gold Medal in 1884. He died in London in 1900, and was buried in a simple Gothic tomb (designed by himself) in Tottenham Cemetery, Haringey, North London. The grave can be easily seen from the public path through the cemetery, close to the gate from Tottenham Churchyard. There is a blue plaque on his house in Bedford Square, London.

Works

Butterfield's buildings include:
1842
 Highbury Congregational Chapel (Cotham Church), Bristol
1843
 St John's Church, Jedburgh: lychgate
 1845
 St Saviour's Church and vicarage, Coalpit Heath, south Gloucestershire, 1845 (Butterfield's first Anglican work)
 St Augustine's College, Canterbury, Kent, 1845
 St John the Baptist parish church, Hellidon, Northamptonshire: restoration, 1845–47
 1846
 St Nicholas' Church, Thanington Without, Kent: restoration, 1846
 St Nicholas' Church, Ash, Kent: restoration, 1846
 Abbey Church of Saints Peter & Paul, Dorchester on Thames, Oxfordshire: restoration, 1846–53
 1847
 St Andrew's parish church, Ogbourne St Andrew, Wiltshire: restoration, 1847–49 and vicarage, 1848
 Parish Church of the Holy Trinity with St Edmund, Horfield, Bristol, nave and aisles c1847
 1849
 St Bartholomew's Church, Yealmpton, Devon, PL8 2HG, reconstruction 1849–1852
 The Cathedral of the Isles, Great Cumbrae, Scotland, started 1849 but still incomplete
 St Mary's Church, Ottery St Mary, Devon restoration 1849–1850
 1850
 Goldern Lion Hotel (1850) in the Norfolk sea-side town of Hunstanton.
 St Mary Magdalene church, West Lavington, West Sussex, 1850
 St Ninian's Cathedral, Perth, Scotland, 1850
 St James & St Anne parish church and vicarage, Alfington, Devon, 1850
 Wantage Cemetery, Berkshire: chapel, 1850
 1851
 St Mary's Church, Emmorton, Maryland: stained glass windows, 1851
 St Martin's Church, Great Mongeham, Kent: restoration, 1851
 1853
 St Mary and St Melor parish church, Amesbury, Wiltshire: restoration, 1852–1853
 All Saints' Wykeham, Scarborough, 1853–1855
 Milton Ernest Hall, Bedfordshire, 1853–1858
 St Mary's Church, Langley, Kent, 1853
 1854
 St Nicholas' Hospital, Salisbury, Wiltshire: restoration, 1854
 1855
 St Mary's parish church, Marlston, Berkshire, 1855
 All Saints' Church, Braishfield, Hampshire, 1855
 1856
 St John the Evangelist's parish church, Milton, Oxfordshire, 1856
 Balliol College, Oxford: chapel, 1856–57
 1857
 St Michael's parish church, Gare Hill (Gaer Hill), near Trudoxhill, Somerset, 1857
 St James' church, school and village buildings, Baldersby St James, North Yorkshire, 1857
 Charlton-All-Saints, Wiltshire: school, 1857–58
 1858
 St Andrew's parish church, Landford, Wiltshire, 1858
 Church of St John the Evangelist, better known as the Afghan Church, Mumbai: the reredos, the Afghan War Memorial mosaics, and the tiles, pews and screen, 1858
 St John the Evangelist parish church, Hammersmith, 1858–59
 St John the Baptist, Latton, Wiltshire: chancel, 1858–63
 Pitt Mission Church and School, Pitt, Hursley, Hampshire, 1858
 1859
 All Saints, Margaret Street, London, 1859
St Mary the Virgin, Etal, Northumberland 1859
 St Nicholas' school, Newbury, Berkshire, 1859
 Standlynch Chapel, Trafalgar House, Wiltshire: restoration, 1859–66
 1860
 St Giles' Church, Tadlow, Bedfordshire, 1860
 Charlton All Saints, Wiltshire: vicarage, 1860–62
 1861
 St John the Baptist church, Bamford, Hope Valley, Derbyshire: restoration, 1861
 St Michael's parish church, Letcombe Bassett, Berkshire (now Oxfordshire): nave and south aisle, 1861
 St Mary the Virgin parish church, Castle Eaton, Wiltshire: restoration, 1861–63
 1862
 Lych gate at St Michael & All Angels' Churchyard extension, Houghton-le-Spring, Durham, 1862
 St Martin's parish church, Bremhill, Wiltshire: restoration, 1862–63
 St Michael's parish church, Lyneham, Wiltshire: nave roof and chancel, 1862–65
1863
 Church of St Cross, Manchester, Clayton, Manchester, 1863–66
 St Margaret's parish church, Mapledurham, Oxfordshire: restoration, 1863
 St Mary Magdalene church, Enfield Chase, Middlesex, 1883
 St Michael's parish church, Aldbourne, Wiltshire: restoration, 1863–67
 1864
 St Sebastian, Heathland, Wokingham, Berkshire, 1864
 Merton College, Oxford: Grove Building, 1864
 St Andrew's parish church, Blunsdon St Andrew, Wiltshire: restoration: 1864–68
 Christ Church, Emery Down, Hampshire, 1864
 1865
 St George's parish church, Wootton, Northamptonshire: restoration, 1865
 St Lawrence's Church, Godmersham, Kent: restoration, 1865
 St Augustine's, Queen's Gate, London, 1865
 St Augustine's parish church, Penarth, Glamorgan, 1865–66.
 SS. Peter & Paul parish church, Heytesbury, Wiltshire: restoration, 1865–67
 Holy Saviour church, Hitchin, Hertfordshire, 1865
 1866
 St Anne's church, Dropmore, Littleworth, Buckinghamshire, 1866
 All Saints' parish church, Rangemore, Staffordshire, 1866–67
 St Peter's parish church, Highway, Wiltshire, 1866–67
 1867
 St Barnabas' parish church, Horton-cum-Studley, Oxfordshire, 1867
 St Mary's parish church, Beech Hill, Berkshire, 1867
 Little Faringdon, Oxfordshire: Rectory, 1867
 St Mary's parish, Lower Heyford, Oxfordshire: remodelling of Old Rectory, 1867 (now Tall Chimneys)
 1868
 The Royal Hampshire County Hospital, Winchester, Hampshire, 1868
 St Paul's Church, Wooburn, Buckinghamshire: alterations, 1869
 1869
 St Alban's Church, Holborn, London, 1862
 St Mary Brookfield, Dartmouth Park Road, Tufnell Park, London NW5, 1869–75
 St Peter's Cathedral, Adelaide, South Australia, 1869–1902
 1870
 All Saints' parish church, Whiteparish, Wiltshire: restoration, 1870
 St Leonard's parish church, Broad Blunsdon, Wiltshire: rebuilding, 1870
 Church of St Peter, Great Berkhamsted, Hertfordshire: restoration, 1870–71
 The Rectory (now Butterfield House), formerly attached to Church of St Mary the Virgin, Baldock, Hitchin Street, Baldock, Hertfordshire, 1870–1873
 1871
 St Margaret of Antioch, Barley, Hertfordshire, 1871 additions
 St Paul's, Covent Garden, London, 1871–2: interior alterations
 1872
 St Mary's Church, Milstead, Kent: restoration, 1872
 St Mary's parish church, Purton, Wiltshire: restoration, 1872
 Saint Mary at Stoke parish church, Ipswich, Suffolk, 1872
 1873
 St Michael and All Angels' parish church & school, Poulton, Gloucestershire, 1873
 St Mary's parish church, Dinton, Wiltshire: restoration, 1873–75
 Church of St Peter, Clyffe Pypard, Wiltshire: restoration, 1873–75
 1874
 All Saints' parish church, Braunston, Northamptonshire: restoration, 1874
 All Saints' church, Babbacombe, Devon 1874
 St Denis' church, East Hatley, Cambridgeshire: restoration, 1874
 St George's parish church, West Harnham, Salisbury, Wiltshire: restoration, 1874
 St George's Church, Morebath 1874–75
 St Mary's School, Wantage, Berkshire (now Oxfordshire), 1874–75
 St Margaret's parish church, Knook, Wiltshire: restoration, 1874–76
 1875
 Rugby School, Warwickshire: Chapel and Quadrangle, 1875
 Shaw-cum-Donnington School, Shaw, Berkshire, 1875
 All Hallows Church, Tottenham, London: restoration, 1875-1877
 1876
 Keble College, Oxford 1876
 St Andrew's Church, Buckland, Kent: restoration, 1876
 Holy Cross parish church, Ashton Keynes, Wiltshire: restoration: 1876–77
 St Catherine's parish church, Netherhampton, Wiltshire, 1876–77
 1877
 Ascot Priory, Ascot, Berkshire: chapel, 1877
 St Andrew's parish church, Rugby, Warwickshire, 1877 with later additions of 1895
 St James' church, Christleton, Cheshire, rebuilt 1877
 1878
 Exeter School, Exeter, Devon, 1878–1880
 St Mary Magdalene parish church, Winterbourne Monkton, Wiltshire: rebuilding, 1878
 St John the Baptist parish church, Foxham, Wiltshire: 1878–81
 St John the Evangelist church, Clevedon, Somerset, 1878
 St Mary's parish church, Donnington, Berkshire: chancel, 1878
 St Mary's Convent, Wantage, Berkshire (now Oxfordshire): Noviciate, 1878
 St Mary's parish church, Dodford, Northamptonshire: restoration, 1878–80
 1880
 St Columba's College Chapel, Whitechurch, County Dublin, Ireland, 1880
 St Edith of Wilton parish church, Baverstock Lane, Dinton, Wiltshire: restoration 1880–93
 St Paul's Cathedral, Melbourne (except main tower and spire), Australia, 1880–1891
 1881
 Sarum College, Salisbury, Wiltshire: chapel, 1881
 1885
 St John the Baptist's Church, Ault Hucknall Restoration 1885–89.
 Gordon's School, Surrey, designed the central buildings comprising the Assembly Hall and Reception Building together with the sanatorium and dormitories.
 1888
 St Michael's Church, Woolwich: restoration, 1888
1891
St Mark's Church, Dundela, Belfast, Northern Ireland, 1878 with later additions of 1891
1892
St Augustin's Church, Bournemouth
1895
 St Andrew's parish church, Rugby, Warwickshire, 1877 with later additions of 1895
 Awaiting date
 Ottery St Mary parish church, Devon: south transept refurbishment and marble font
 St Mawgan Old Rectory, Cornwall
 St Peter's Church, Bont Goch, Ceredigion

Publications

References

Bibliography

External links

 William Butterfield architectural and design drawings, 1838–1892, Getty Research Institute, Los Angeles, Accession No. 850998

1814 births
1900 deaths
19th-century English architects
Gothic Revival architects
English ecclesiastical architects
Keble College, Oxford
Recipients of the Royal Gold Medal
Architects of cathedrals
Architects from London